991 McDonalda is a Themistian asteroid. It was discovered by Otto Struve in 1922 at the Yerkes Observatory in Williams Bay, Wisconsin, United States. It is named after the McDonald Observatory, which Struve helped found in 1939.

References

External links 
 
 

000991
Discoveries by Otto Struve
Named minor planets
991 McDonalda
000991
19221024